Ryan Grubb is an American football coach and former player. He currently serves as the associate head coach, offensive coordinator and quarterbacks coach for the Washington Huskies.

Playing career
Grubb played football while attending Kingsley–Pierson High School. Later, from 1994 to 1997, Grubb attended Buena Vista University, where he played running back and wide receiver for the Beavers. He was a four-year starter and served as team captain during his time at Buena Vista.

Coaching career

Early Coaching Career
Grubb's coaching career began in 2003, when he took a position at his alma mater, Kingsley–Pierson High School, as their offensive coordinator. In his second of two seasons at Kingsley–Pierson, Grubb was named the Iowa High School Athletic Association Class 1A Assistant Coach of the Year. After departing, he moved to the NCAA Division I ranks; while pursuing his master's degree, Grubb served on the coaching staff for at South Dakota State – in 2005 as their running backs coach and in 2006 as their wide receivers coach. Among the players he coached at South Dakota State was JaRon Harris, who would later be named to an NFL practice squad.

Sioux Falls
In 2007, he took a position at Sioux Falls under head coach Kalen DeBoer, where he would remain for seven years. For the first three seasons, Grubb served as the offensive line coach and run game coordinator for the Cougars, while in his last four seasons he was the offensive coordinator and quarterbacks coach. During his time at Sioux Falls, Grubb also served as the school's strength and conditioning coach; in addition to winning two NAIA national championships with the football team, he was also named NAIA National Strength and Conditioning Coach of the Year in 2008.

Eastern Michigan
When DeBoer was hired as the offensive coordinator at Eastern Michigan in 2014, Grubb followed, taking the offensive line coach position with the Eagles.

Fresno State
He stayed in Ypsilanti for three seasons before following DeBoer to Fresno State Bulldogs football upon DeBoer's hiring as the Bulldogs' offensive coordinator in 2017; Grubb was hired to the position of offensive line coach and run game coordinator, and added the titles of offensive coordinator and associate head coach entering 2019.

Washington
In December 2021 Grubb said he was going to Washington.

Personal life
Grubb attended Kingsley–Pierson High School, in his hometown of Kingsley, Iowa. He earned a Bachelor of Business Administration from Buena Vista University in 1999, and later earned a Master of Science in sports administration from South Dakota State University in sports pedagogy in 2006.

References

Further reading

 
 

Year of birth missing (living people)
Living people
American football running backs
American football wide receivers
American strength and conditioning coaches
Buena Vista Beavers football players
Eastern Michigan Eagles football coaches
Fresno State Bulldogs football coaches
Sioux Falls Cougars football coaches
South Dakota State Jackrabbits football coaches
High school football coaches in Iowa
Fort Hays State University alumni
South Dakota State University alumni
People from Plymouth County, Iowa
Coaches of American football from Iowa
Players of American football from Iowa
21st-century American people